Miss Universe Great Britain 2019 was the 11th Miss Universe Great Britain pageant, held on 13 July 2019 at Mercure Holland House Cardiff, Cardiff, Wales. Dee-Ann Kentish-Rogers of Birmingham crowned her successor Emma Jenkins of Wales at the end of the event. Emma  represented Great Britain at the Miss Universe 2019.

Final results

Special Awards

Official Delegates
Meet the 40 national delegates competing for the title of Miss Universe Great Britain 2019:

References

External links
Official Website

2019
2019 in Wales
2019 in the United Kingdom
2019 beauty pageants
Beauty pageants in Wales
Events in Cardiff